The Dublin and Blessington Steam Tramway (DBST), later the Blessington and Poulaphouca Steam Tramway, operated steam-powered trams between Terenure in Dublin and Blessington in Co. Wicklow from 1888 until 1932.

History
On Wednesday, August 1, 1888, the Dublin & Blessington Steam Tramway (the DBST) opened for business. The first train was the 8:35 a.m. mail train leaving Terenure for Blessington. The tramway connected with the horse-drawn trams from the city.

An extension of the line to Poulaphouca was opened in 1895, and the Blessington and Poulaphouca Steam Tramway was incorporated, with through-running from Terenure from 1896 until the extension was closed in 1927.

In 1911, a major proposal was put forward for the electrification of the line as far as Crooksling, but the intervention of World War I  meant that this was never put into effect.

In 1929, the Paragon Omnibus Company began operating a through bus service between Blessington and the city centre, eliminating the requirement for passengers to transfer between the DBST and the Dublin tram at Terenure. This struck a fatal blow to the DBST.

Last-ditch efforts were made in 1931 to have the DBST taken over by either the Dublin United Tramway Company, or by the Great Southern Railways. This did not come to pass, and so it was, that on 31 December 1932, a wet Saturday night, the last trains ran on the DBST lines, the 6:15 p.m. from Terenure to Blessington, and the 10:30 p.m. from Terenure to Tallaght.

Many people were killed in the tram days, including many who were the worse for drink, who were knocked down by the tram which was known to appear suddenly and silently from around a turn in the road, or behind a hedge. In one case, a conductor was thrown to his death from the swaying trailer car. In Templeogue the bodies of the dead were taken to the local pub the Templeogue Inn. This occurred so often the pub became known as The morgue

Sources
Fayle, H. & Newham, A. T., The Dublin & Blessington Steam Tramway, 1963.

Notes and references

External links
Dublin & Blessington Steam Tramway
Loco No. 10 at Templeogue, 1929

Tram transport in the Republic of Ireland
Templeogue
Dublin and Blessington Steam Tramway